John William Andrews   (8 May 1892 – 27 June 1983) was a New Zealand businessman and politician. He was Mayor of Lower Hutt from 1933 to 1947.

Biography
Andrews was born in 1892. He operated a joinery manufacturing business and became both a company director and later president of the Lower Hutt Chamber of Commerce. He was a Battalion Commander in the Home Guard during World War II.

From 1933, he was Mayor of Lower Hutt for five consecutive terms. He was also a member of the Wellington Harbour Board. He was first elected in 1938 (after being defeated in 1935) and served three terms until 1947.

He became involved in politics and joined the United Party and organised James Kerr's campaign at the 1929 Hutt by-election.

In the 1950 King's Birthday Honours, Andrews was appointed an Officer of the Order of the British Empire, in recognition of his 15 years of service as mayor of Lower Hutt. In 1953, he was awarded the Queen Elizabeth II Coronation Medal. Andrews Avenue in Lower Hutt city was named after him.

Andrews died on 27 June 1983.

References

References

1892 births
1983 deaths
Hutt City Councillors
Mayors of Lower Hutt
Wellington Harbour Board members
United Party (New Zealand) politicians
New Zealand Legion politicians
New Zealand National Party politicians
New Zealand Officers of the Order of the British Empire
Unsuccessful candidates in the 1938 New Zealand general election
Unsuccessful candidates in the 1951 New Zealand general election
New Zealand military personnel of World War II